The Best & le meilleur is the third compilation album and the second greatest hits album by Australian singer and songwriter Tina Arena and was released on 30 March 2009 in France. The album also received a digital release on the iTunes Store in her native Australia in early April 2009.

The album contains three new recordings, "This Universe", "Night Fever", and "Out Here on My Own", a duet with Patrick Fiori. "This Universe" is an English-language version of the Italian song "Io so che tu" by Davide Esposito. The song was also the most successful single for the French singer Grégory Lemarchal when released as "Ecris l'histoire" in 2005. Esposito's version was released in 2006 and peaked at number 20 on the French singles chart. "Night Fever" is a cover of the Bee Gees song, popularised by the Saturday Night Fever soundtrack, and it was recorded for a French TV disco special.

The album peaked at number two on the French Compilations chart, falling out of the top ten in its fifth week and spending only eight weeks in the top 30. It also peaked at number 11 on the Belgian (Wallonia) Albums Chart and spent 23 weeks in the top 100.

Track listing

Charts

Weekly charts

Year-end charts

References

Tina Arena compilation albums
2009 greatest hits albums